Taqqut Productions is an Inuit-owned film production company founded in 2011 by Louise Flaherty and Neil Christopher. It is headquartered in Iqaluit, Nunavut, Canada.

Background 
Taqqut is a creator and producer of film and television projects. It also provides additional project production services including web design, marketing and technical writing. Taqqut Productions is proudly Inuit-owned and has a mandate of bringing stories of the North to the world through the voices of people from the North.

Meaning of name 
The name taqqut comes from an Inuktitut word. For hundreds of years Inuit used a special tool called a taqqut to fan the flames of their qulliq, the stone lamps that burn oil from rendered animal fat. This tool, the taqqut, would become blackened with soot after fanning flames and could then be used to draw images and tell stories.

Productions

Television

Anaana's Tent 
Anaana's Tent is a children's television show target toward 2 to 5-year-olds. It was filmed in both Inuktitut and English, but has an emphasis on teaching children the Inuktitut language.

It is hosted by Rita Claire Mike-Murphy and consists of different segments including live action, puppets and animated segments. Taqqut Productions announced via Twitter on 11 March 2019 that they were working on a second season of the show.

Digital/Webseries

Arctic Horror Stories 
In 2018 the Canada Media Fund announced that the Taqqut Productions project Arctic Horror Stories, produced in partnership with Colombia's Conexion Creativa, would recited $59,560 in funding. This funding comes from a Canada-Columbia Codevelopment Incentive.

Film 
Taqqut has produced a number of short animated films, some of which are listed below
 Amaqqut Nunat: The Country of Wolves (2011)
 The Orphan and the Polar Bear (2013)
 The Amautalik (2014)
 Ogress of the Gravelbank (2015)
 Little Fold of the Arctic (2015)
 The Owl and the Lemming (2016)
 Ukaliq and Kalla Go Fishing (2017)
 The Giant Bear (2018)

References

External links
 

Canadian companies established in 2011
Companies based in Nunavut
Iqaluit
Film production companies of Canada
Television production companies of Canada
Indigenous film and television production companies in Canada
Indigenous organizations in Nunavut
Mass media companies established in 2011
2011 establishments in Nunavut